Driveway Heart Attack is the twelfth studio album by Australian indie rock band, The Fauves, which was released on 31 May 2019 as a double album via Shock Records. To promote the album they supported Regurgitator on the latter's 25th anniversary tour in October–November 2019.

Critical reception
Geoff Jenke of Eventalaide observed, "the witty lyrics are still with them on their new album... the music has a catchy hook to it and stills sounds fresh." Consumes writer described how, "its songs of quiet melancholy, fake positivity and misdirected longing are carefully curated to ensure that that listeners must expend maximum effort to access their favourites. You can try to skip songs but you risk scratching the record."

Track listing

Personnel

 Andrew Coxguitar, vocals
 Philip Leonardguitar, vocals
 Adam Neweydrums, vocals
 Timothy Cleaverbass guitar, vocals

References 

2019 albums
The Fauves albums
Shock Records albums